Emil Faktor (born 31 August 1876 in Prague, Austro-Hungary) was a German language theater critic, editor and writer.   Sources sometimes identify him as "Jussuf" which was the pseudonym under which his regular contributions to the Berliner Börsen-Courier (newspaper) appeared.

Biography 
Faktor was the son of German Jews. He studied law in his home city and received a doctorate of law degree in 1904.  He also worked as an editor and critic for Bohemia magazine. In 1908 he moved from Prague to Berlin, where he wrote for the illustrated daily newspaper Der Tag. From 1912 he was responsible the "Feuilleton" section along with theater and music editorship at the Berliner Börsen-Courier (literally, "Berlin Stock Exchange Courier"), for which he became editor-in-chief in 1917. In the following years, he became one of the city's best-known theater critics.

Emil Faktor married Sophie Sack around 1913.   Their children Richard and Lili were born in 1914 and 1917 during the war years.   Fourteen years younger than her husband, Sophie Sack was a talented concert pianist whose teachers had included Artur Schnabel.   As was so often the case at that time, she married just as her professional career was beginning to take off, and domestic duties now took precedence.

In addition to his journalistic work, Faktor also wrote poetry and plays. Among others, he published poetry books What I Seek (1899) and Jahresringe (1908), and comedies The Temperate (1914) and The Daughter (1917).

In 1931 Faktor was forced to resign - reportedly "at his own wish" - from his post as editor-in-chief because of his Jewish ancestry. In 1933 he returned with his wife Sophie to Prague. There he continued to work as a freelance journalist and critic for the Prague Tagblatt and the Prague Noon. The Faktors' daughter Lili fled to the United States of America in March 1939, and she arranged the affidavits necessary to permit her parents to follow her there, but the US authorities appear to have been applying restrictive immigration quotas:  Emil and Sophie Faktor never obtained entry visas for the United States.  On 21 October 1941 Faktor and his wife were deported from Prague and sent to the Litzmannstadt ghetto where they were killed on 10 April 1942.

References

External links 

  
 Nachlass von Emil Faktor in der Bayerischen Staatsbibliothek

1876 births
1942 deaths
Writers from Prague
German journalists
Czechoslovak journalists
German literary critics
German theatre critics
German columnists
German film critics
Jewish emigrants from Nazi Germany
People who died in the Łódź Ghetto
Czechoslovak Jews who died in the Holocaust
German newspaper editors
Austro-Hungarian emigrants to Germany